Below is a partial list of minor league baseball players in the Cleveland Guardians system.

Players

Logan Allen

Logan Taylor Allen (born September 5, 1998) is an American professional baseball pitcher in the Cleveland Guardians organization.

Allen grew up in Deltona, Florida and attended University High School in Orange City, Florida. He was named The Daytona Beach News-Journal Player of the Year for three straight seasons and was named the Florida Gatorade Baseball Player of the Year and Florida Mr. Baseball as a senior. In his final high school start, Allen threw a no-hitter to send University to the state championship game. Allen was selected in the 16th round of the 2017 Major League Baseball draft by the Baltimore Orioles, but opted not to sign.

Allen played college baseball for the FIU Panthers as both a pitcher and a first baseman. In 2018, he was named a Freshman All-American by the NCBWA, Collegiate Baseball Newspaper, and Perfect Game and second team All-Conference USA as a utility player after posting a 5–5 record with a 3.89 earned run average and 85 strikeouts in 74 innings pitched while also batting .309 with two home runs and 16 runs batted in. As a sophomore, Allen was named first team All-Conference USA after went 4–6 with a 3.11 earned run average with 120 strikeouts in 84 innings pitched and hit .276 with three home runs. After the 2019 season, he played collegiate summer baseball with the Harwich Mariners of the Cape Cod Baseball League. As a junior in 2020, Allen went 2–1 with a 2.45 earned run average in four starts batted .286 with one home run and two runs batted in before the season was cut short due to the coronavirus pandemic.

Allen was drafted by the Cleveland Indians in the second round of the 2020 Major League Baseball draft. Allen was assigned to the High-A Lake County Captains at the beginning of the 2021 season, where he went 5–0 with a 1.58 earned run average in nine starts before being promoted to the Double-A Akron RubberDucks. He had a 2.85 ERA with 76 strikeouts in 60 innings pitched after his promotion. Allen returned to Akron at the beginning of the 2022 season before being promoted to the Triple-A Columbus Clippers after going 5–3 with a 3.33 ERA and 104 strikeouts in 73 innings over 13 starts.

FIU Panthers bio

Tanner Bibee

Tanner Bibee (born March 5, 1999) is an American professional baseball pitcher in the Cleveland Guardians organization.

Bibee attended Mission Viejo High School in Mission Viejo, California and played college baseball at California State University, Fullerton. In 2019, he played collegiate summer baseball with the Wareham Gatemen of the Cape Cod Baseball League. Bibee was eligible for the 2020 Major League Baseball Draft, but went undrafted and returned to Fullerton for his senior year. He was then drafted by the Cleveland Guardians in the fifth round of the 2021 MLB Draft.

Bibee made his professional debut in 2022 with the Lake County Captains.

Jason Bilous

Jason Peter Bilous (born August 11, 1997) is an American professional baseball pitcher for the Cleveland Guardians of Major League Baseball (MLB).

Bilous attended Caravel Academy in Bear, Delaware. As a junior in 2014, he went 11–1 with 84 strikeouts over  innings alongside batting .483. He underwent Tommy John surgery during the fall of his senior year, and did not play a game that season. He was selected by the Los Angeles Dodgers in the 29th round of the 2015 Major League Baseball draft, but did not sign and instead enrolled at Coastal Carolina University where he played college baseball.

In 2016, as a freshman at Coastal Carolina, Bilous pitched  innings, going 3–1 with a 4.43 ERA and 47 strikeouts as Coastal Carolina won the 2016 College World Series. As a sophomore in 2017, he appeared in 13 games (ten starts) in which he went 3–2 with a 4.61 ERA and sixty strikeouts over  innings. In 2016 and 2017, he played collegiate summer baseball with the Cotuit Kettleers of the Cape Cod Baseball League. In 2018, his junior year, he started 16 games and pitched to a 7–3 record and 4.00 ERA, striking out 105 over  innings. Following the season's end, he was selected by the Chicago White Sox in the 13th round of the 2018 Major League Baseball draft.

Bilous signed with the White Sox and made his professional debut with the Great Falls Voyagers of the Rookie Advanced Pioneer League, going 0–4 with a 7.85 ERA over  innings. In 2019, he played with the Kannapolis Intimidators of the Class A South Atlantic League where he pitched to a 6–10 record with a 3.70 ERA over 31 games (17 starts), striking out 113 batters over  innings. He did not play a game in 2020 due to the cancellation of the minor league season caused by the COVID-19 pandemic. Bilous began the 2021 season with the Winston-Salem Dash of the High-A East and was promoted to the Birmingham Barons of the Double-A South in late May. Over twenty starts between the two clubs, Bilous went 3–8 with a 5.76 ERA and 106 strikeouts over  innings.

On November 19, 2021, Chicago selected Bilous' contract and added him to their 40-man roster. He returned to the Barons to open the 2022 season. In early August, he was promoted to the Charlotte Knights of the Triple-A International League. Over 31 games (21 starts) between the two teams, he went 6–11 with a 6.30 ERA, 131 strikeouts, and 79 walks over  innings.

On February 3, 2023, Bilous was designated for assignment by Chicago following the acquisition of Frank German.

On February 9, 2023, Bilous was claimed off waivers by the Cleveland Guardians. Bilous was optioned to the Triple-A Columbus Clippers to begin the 2023 season.

Juan Brito

Juan Manuel Brito (born September 24, 2001) is a Dominican professional baseball infielder in the Cleveland Guardians organization.

Brito was signed by the Colorado Rockies as an international free agent on July 7, 2018. 

On November 15, 2022, the Rockies traded him to the Cleveland Guardians in exchange for Nolan Jones; the same day, the Guardians added Brito to their 40-man roster to protect him from selection by another club in the 2022 Rule 5 draft. Brito was optioned to the Triple-A Columbus Clippers to begin the 2023 season.

Joey Cantillo

Joseph Lopaka Cantillo (born December 18, 1999) is an American professional baseball pitcher in the Cleveland Guardians organization.

Cantillo attended Kailua High School in Kailua, Hawaii where he played baseball. He committed to play college baseball at the University of Kentucky. In 2017, his senior year, he was named the Gatorade Baseball Player of the Year for the state of Hawaii after pitching to a 5–1 record and 1.24 earned run average (ERA) along with batting .517. After his senior year, he was drafted by the San Diego Padres in the 16th round of the 2017 Major League Baseball draft and signed for $302,500.

After signing with the Padres, Cantillo made his professional debut with the Rookie-level Arizona League Padres; over eight innings, he compiled a 4.50 ERA. In 2018, he spent the majority of the year back in the Arizona League in which he went 2–2 with a 2.18 ERA over 11 games (nine starts), striking out 58 over  innings. He also pitched in one game for the Fort Wayne TinCaps of the Class A Midwest League at the end of the year. Cantillo returned to Fort Wayne to begin 2019. During the season, he earned Midwest League Pitcher of the Week three times alongside earning Pitcher of the Month honors for June. After pitching to a 9–3 record and a 1.98 ERA while striking out 128 batters over 98 innings (19 starts) with Fort Wayne, he was promoted to the Lake Elsinore Storm of the Class A-Advanced California League in August. With Lake Elsinore, Cantillo made three starts in which he compiled a 4.61 ERA before being shut down for the season due to reaching his innings limit.

On July 31, 2020, Cantillo was one of six players (along with Austin Hedges, Cal Quantrill, Josh Naylor, Gabriel Arias, and Owen Miller) sent to the Cleveland Indians in exchange for Mike Clevinger, Greg Allen, and Matt Waldron. He did not play a minor league game in 2020 due to the cancellation of the minor league season caused by the COVID-19 pandemic. He began the 2021 season on the injured list with abdominal soreness. He was activated in late August and joined the Akron RubberDucks of the Double-A Northeast. He pitched eight innings for the year, going 0–2 and giving up four runs. He returned to Akron for the 2022 season. In early August, he was placed on the injured list with a shoulder injury and missed the remainder of the season. Over 14 games (13 starts), he went 4-3 with a 1.93 ERA and 87 strikeouts over  innings.

On November 15, 2022, the Guardians selected Cantillo's contract and added him to the 40-man roster. Cantillo was optioned to the Triple-A Columbus Clippers to begin the 2023 season.

Jake Fox

Jake Fox (born February 12, 2003) is an American professional baseball second baseman and outfielder in the Cleveland Guardians organization.

Fox grew up in Lakeland, Florida and attended Lakeland Christian School. He hit .378, with three home runs, 22 RBIs, and 32 stolen bases in 28 games played as a senior. Fox had committed to play college baseball at Florida prior to signing with Cleveland.

Fox was selected in the third round of the 2021 Major League Baseball draft by the Cleveland Indians.After signing with the team he was assigned to the Rookie-level Arizona Complex League Indians, where he batted .405 in 13 games played.

Isaiah Greene

Isaiah Jordan Greene (born August 29, 2001) is an American professional baseball outfielder in the Cleveland Guardians organization.

Greene attended Corona High School in Corona, California. He was selected by the New York Mets with the 69th overall selection of the 2020 Major League Baseball draft. He signed for $850,000, forgoing his commitment to play college baseball at the University of Missouri. He did not play a minor league game in 2020 due to the cancellation of the minor league season caused by the COVID-19 pandemic.

On January 7, 2021, the Mets traded Greene, Amed Rosario, Andrés Giménez, and Josh Wolf to the Cleveland Indians for Francisco Lindor and Carlos Carrasco. He made his professional debut with the Rookie-level Arizona Complex League Indians, slashing .289/.421/.368 with one home run, 16 runs batted in (RBIs), four stolen bases, and nine doubles over 43 games.

Tim Herrin

Tim Herrin (born October 8, 1996) is an American professional baseball pitcher in the Cleveland Guardians organization.

Herrin attended South Vigo High School in Terre Haute, Indiana, where he played football, basketball and baseball. After graduating in 2015, he enrolled at Indiana University where he played three years of college baseball. During the summer of 2017, he played in the Cape Cod Baseball League for the Harwich Mariners. As a junior in 2018, he appeared in 17 games (making ten starts) and went 6–0 with a 3.22 ERA over  innings. After the season, he was selected by the Cleveland Indians in the 29th round of the 2018 Major League Baseball draft.

Herrin signed with the Indians and made his professional debut with the Arizona League Indians, going 0–1 with a 6.16 ERA over 19 innings. He opened the 2019 season with the Mahoning Valley Scrappers and was promoted to the Lake County Captains during the season. Over 23 relief appearances between both teams, he went 2–0 with a 2.93 ERA over 43 innings. He did not play minor league game in 2020 due to the cancellation of the minor league season. He returned to play in 2021 with Lake County with whom he went 4–3 with a 2.57 ERA and 85 strikeouts over  innings. He opened the 2022 season with the Akron RubberDucks before being promoted to the Columbus Clippers. Over 46 games (two starts) between the two teams, he went 1-4 with a 4.02 ERA and 101 strikeouts over  innings.

On November 15, 2022, the Guardians selected Herrin's contract and added him to the 40-man roster.

Ángel Martínez

Ángel Martínez (born January 27, 2002) is a Dominican professional baseball infielder in the Cleveland Guardians organization.

Martínez signed with the Cleveland Indians as an international free agent in 2018. He made his professional debut in 2019 with the Dominican Summer League Indians.

Martínez did not play in 2020 due to the Minor League Baseball season being cancelled because of the Covid-19 pandemic. He returned in 2021 to play for the Low-A Lynchburg Hillcats and started 2022 with the High-A Lake County Captains.

The Guardians selected Martínez's contract on November 15, 2022, adding him to their 40-man roster. Martínez was optioned to the Triple-A Columbus Clippers to begin the 2023 season.

His father, Sandy Martínez, played in MLB.

Nick Mikolajchak

Nicholas Austin Mikolajchak (born November 21, 1997) is an American professional baseball pitcher for the Cleveland Guardians organization.

Mikolajchak went to Klein Collins High School in Harris County, Texas, where he played baseball and basketball. He was FirstTeam AllDistrict in his junior season and District MVP in his senior season of high school. He committed to Sam Houston State to play college baseball starting in 2016.

In 2016 as a freshman, Mikolajchak worked exclusively as a reliever and a closer for the team, posting a 3.38 ERA and an 0–4 record in 32 games. As a sophomore in 2017 for Sam Houston State, he played in 22 games, starting 9 and closing 2 of them. He went 5–4 with an earned run average of 4.19 in 73 innings. Mikolajchak played collegiate summer baseball for the Falmouth Commodores of the Cape Cod Baseball League in 2018, pitching in 8 games and scoring an earned run average of 1.84. For Mikolajchak's junior season in 2019, he pitched in 23 games, starting and closing 7 games each. He pitched 64.2 innings and compiled a 5–4 record with 74 strikeouts, improving from 32 in his freshman year. Mikolajchak was drafted by the Cleveland Indians in the 11th round with the 340th overall pick, becoming the third player from San Houston State to be drafted at that point.

Mikolajchak elected to forgo his senior season at San Houston State and signed with the Indians on June 14, 2019. In his first professional season with the Indians, Mikolajchak played for two of the Indians' minor league affiliates, combining for a 1–1 record with an 0.36 earned run average and 36 strikeouts across 17 games. He did not play a minor league game in 2020 due to the cancellation of the minor league season caused by the COVID-19 pandemic. Mikolajchak made the Indians' alternate site roster for the beginning of the 2021 season.

Jhonkensy Noel

Jhonkensy Noel (born July 15, 2001) is a Dominican professional baseball infielder in the Cleveland Guardians organization.

Noel signed with the Cleveland Indians organization as an international free agent on July 15, 2017. He made his professional debut in 2018 with the Dominican Summer League Indians, batting .243 with ten home runs and 34 runs batted in over 64 games. In 2019, he played for the Arizona League Indians where he hit .287 with six home runs and 42 runs batted in over 47 games. He did not play a game in 2020 due to the cancellation of the minor league season. Noel split the 2021 season between the Arizona League, the Lynchburg Hillcats, and the Lake County Captains, slashing .340/.390/.615 with 19 home runs and 66 runs batted in over 70 games.

The newly named Cleveland Guardians selected Noel to their 40-man roster on November 19, 2021. Noel was optioned to the Triple-A Columbus Clippers to begin the 2023 season.

Brayan Rocchio

Brayan Hommy Rocchio (born January 13, 2001) is a Venezuelan professional baseball shortstop for the Cleveland Guardians organization.

Rocchio was signed as an international free agent by the Cleveland Indians in July 2017. He made his professional debut with the Dominican Summer League Indians in 2018.

Rocchio was promoted to the Arizona League Indians after hitting .323 in 25 games for the DSL Indians. He had an even better season with the AZL Indians, hitting for a .343 batting average in 35 games. Across both leagues in his first professional season, Rocchio hit .335 in 60 games. For his 2019 season, he played the full season with the Mahoning Valley Scrappers in LowA ball. He played in 69 games, hitting for a .250 batting average. He did not play a minor league game in 2020 due to the cancellation of the minor league season caused by the COVID-19 pandemic.

The newly named Cleveland Guardians selected Rocchio to their 40-man roster on November 19, 2021. Rocchio was optioned to the Triple-A Columbus Clippers to begin the 2023 season.

José Tena

José Luis Tena (born March 20, 2001) is a Dominican professional baseball infielder in the Cleveland Guardians organization.

Tena signed with the Cleveland Indians as an international free agent in July 2017. He made his professional debut in 2018 with the Dominican Summer League Indians, batting 313 with one home run and 23 runs batted in over 51 games. He spent the 2019 season with the Arizona League Indians where he hit .325 with one home run and 18 runs batted in over 44 games. He did play a game in 2020 due to the cancellation of the minor league season. Tena spent the 2021 season with the Lake County Captains, slashing .281/.331/.467 with 16 home runs and 58 runs batted in over 107 games. After the season, he played in the Arizona Fall League for the Scottsdale Scorpions where he won the batting title with a .387 average over 17 games.

The newly named Cleveland Guardians selected Tena to their 40-man roster on November 19, 2021. Tena was optioned to the Triple-A Columbus Clippers to begin the 2023 season.

Carson Tucker

Carson Wesley Tucker (born January 24, 2002) is an American professional baseball shortstop in the Cleveland Guardians organization. He was selected 23rd overall by the Cleveland Indians in the 2020 Major League Baseball draft.

Tucker attended Mountain Pointe High School in Phoenix, Arizona, where he played baseball. In 92 games at Mountain Pointe during his high school career, he hit .390 with five home runs and 68 runs batted in. In 2013 and 2014, he was selected for U-12 United States national baseball team. He committed to play college baseball at the University of Texas.

Tucker was selected by the Cleveland Indians with the 23rd overall pick in the 2020 Major League Baseball draft. Tucker signed with the Indians on June 26 for a $2 million bonus. He did not play a minor league game in 2020 due to the cancellation of the minor league season caused by the COVID-19 pandemic. He made his professional debut in 2021 with the Rookie-level Arizona Complex League Indians, but appeared in only six games due to a hand injury. He was assigned to the Lynchburg Hillcats of the Low-A Carolina League to begin the 2022 season. In early May, he was placed on the injured list with a right forearm strain. Over 38 games, he hit .137 with one home run, nine RBIs, and five doubles.

Tucker's brother, Cole, plays in the Colorado Rockies organization.

Full Triple-A to Rookie League rosters
Below are the rosters of the minor league affiliates of the Cleveland Guardians.

Triple-A

Double-A

High-A

Single-A

Rookie

Foreign Rookie

References

Lists of minor league baseball players
Minor league players